Reinventing the Steel is the ninth and latest studio album by American heavy metal band Pantera, released on March 21, 2000 through East West Records. This was the last studio album Pantera released before their nineteen-year breakup from November 2003 to July 2022, and it is the band's final album to feature the Abbott brothers Dimebag Darrell and Vinnie Paul, before their deaths in 2004 and 2018, respectively.

Background
Reinventing the Steel was produced by the Abbott brothers in addition to Sterling Winfield, making it Pantera's first studio album since 1988's Power Metal not to be produced by Terry Date.

In Australia, a two-disc "Tour Edition" of the album was released. The first disc consists of the album proper while the second is an unofficial hits compilation.

The album was reissued in October 2020 with extra discs including a new mix by Date and unreleased tracks to honor the album's 20th anniversary.

Unlike other Pantera releases, two B-sides were recorded during the Reinventing the Steel sessions, those being "Avoid the Light" and "Immortally Insane", found on the Dracula 2000 and Heavy Metal 2000, and the Texas Chainsaw Massacre soundtracks, respectively.

Lyrics and style
Reinventing the Steel contains lyrics mostly about the band itself, as on "We'll Grind that Axe for a Long Time" (where the band members tell about how they have kept it "true" throughout the years, while many of their peers "sucked up for the fame") and "I'll Cast a Shadow" (about Pantera's influence on the genre). There are also songs about their fans, like "Goddamn Electric" and "You've Got to Belong to It". "Goddamn Electric" mentions Black Sabbath and Slayer, two of Pantera's main influences. The solo for "Goddamn Electric" was recorded by Kerry King in a bathroom after Slayer performed at Ozzfest in Dallas. The band members dedicated Reinventing the Steel to their fans who they viewed as their "brothers and sisters".

Artwork
The cover art is by Scott Caliva (1967–2003), a friend of Pantera lead singer Phil Anselmo. Caliva took the photo of a partygoer at Anselmo's house jumping through a bonfire clutching a bottle of Wild Turkey bourbon whiskey. The bottle is pixelated on the cover so the label would not be visible, to avoid copyright infringement.

The 20th Anniversary Edition cover art was only made with the steel marking background, along with the logo and the album name similar to their 1990 album, Cowboys from Hell.

Reception

Commercial performance

Reinventing the Steel reached number 4 on the Billboard 200 chart, number 8 on the Top Canadian Albums chart, and number 5 on the Top Internet Albums chart. It held its position in the Billboard 200 for over 12 weeks. The album's fifth track, "Revolution Is My Name", reached number 28 on Billboards Mainstream Rock Tracks. The album was certified gold by the RIAA on May 2, 2000, however, it has yet to reach platinum status, making it Pantera's only major-label studio album not to reach sales of 1,000,000.

Review scores 
Rolling Stone (5/25/00, p. 73) – 3.5 stars out of 5 – "Metal-revivalist....relying on the genre's primal elements of rage and analog noise...chopped up with squealing dissonance....brutal enough to please underground purists and familiar enough for weekend headbangers."

Entertainment Weekly (3/24/00, p. 102) – "...resumes their scorched-earth policy with vigor....dropping aural anvils [along] with a dash of inventiveness..." – Rating: B+

Q magazine (6/00, p. 112) – 3 stars out of 5 – "Pantera's attempt to upgrade [Judas Priest's] British Steel-era pure metal spirit....unequivocal heavy metalness."

Alternative Press (7/00, pp. 108–9) – 5 out of 5 – "An undiluted, unvarnished slab of riffs paying distinct homage to Judas Priest's British Steel, and not just in a titular sense, but in basic song construction."

CMJ (4/3/00, p. 32) – "Crammed with everything they've used to revolutionize metal....so old-school it could have been easily made in between the quartet's back-to-back classics."

NME (4/15/00, p. 34) – 6 out of 10 – "An unfashionably old-school metal album....it's Pantera's bid to herald the rebirth of bullet-belt, cut-off denim metal....It's a solid album, oozing drunk-as-hell metal spirit."

Accolades
In the 2000 Metal Edge Readers' Choice Awards, the album was voted "Album of the Year" and "Album Cover of the Year" (tying with Iron Maiden's Brave New World for the latter), while the single "Revolution Is My Name" won "Song of the Year".

"Revolution Is My Name" was nominated for a Grammy Award for Best Metal Performance in 2001, but lost to Deftones' "Elite".

The album was ranked at No. 2 on Guitar Worlds Readers Poll for "The Top 10 Guitar Albums of 2000".

A section of "Death Rattle" was used for the 2001 episode of SpongeBob SquarePants called "Pre-Hibernation Week".

Track listing
All credits adapted from the original CD issue.

20th Anniversary Edition
Released in October 2020, The 20th Anniversary Edition of Reinventing the Steel includes re-mixes of the tracklist done by longtime Pantera producer Terry Date, as well as singles that were previously not released on any studio albums also remixed by Terry Date, radio edits of album tracks, and instrumental rough mixes of the album's original tracks. 

PersonnelPanteraPhil Anselmo – vocals
Dimebag Darrell – guitars, production
Rex Brown – bass
Vinnie Paul – drums, production, engineering, mixingAdditional personnelKerry King – outro guitar on "Goddamn Electric"Technical personnel'
Sterling Winfield – production, engineering, mixing
Howie Weinberg – mastering at Masterdisk, New York
Recorded at Chasin Jason Studios, Arlington, TX

Charts

Singles

Certifications

References

2000 albums
Pantera albums
East West Records albums